Sin Dae-cheol (born 17 August 1959) is a South Korean former cyclist. He competed at the 1984 Summer Olympics and the 1988 Summer Olympics and 1986 Asian Games.

References

External links
 

1959 births
Living people
South Korean male cyclists
Olympic cyclists of South Korea
Cyclists at the 1984 Summer Olympics
Cyclists at the 1988 Summer Olympics
Place of birth missing (living people)
Asian Games medalists in cycling
Cyclists at the 1986 Asian Games
Medalists at the 1986 Asian Games
Asian Games gold medalists for South Korea